In mathematical analysis, a family of functions is equicontinuous if all the functions are continuous and they have equal variation over a given neighbourhood, in a precise sense described herein. 
In particular, the concept applies to countable families, and thus sequences of functions.

Equicontinuity appears in the formulation of Ascoli's theorem, which states that a subset of C(X), the space of continuous functions on a compact Hausdorff space X, is compact if and only if it is closed, pointwise bounded and equicontinuous. 
As a corollary, a sequence in C(X) is uniformly convergent if and only if it is equicontinuous and converges pointwise to a function (not necessarily continuous a-priori). 
In particular, the limit of an equicontinuous pointwise convergent sequence of continuous functions fn on either metric space or locally compact space is continuous. If, in addition, fn are holomorphic, then the limit is also holomorphic.

The uniform boundedness principle states that a pointwise bounded family of continuous linear operators between Banach spaces is equicontinuous.

Equicontinuity between metric spaces 

Let X and Y be two metric spaces, and F a family of functions from X to Y. We shall denote by d the respective metrics of these spaces.

The family F is equicontinuous at a point x0 ∈ X if for every ε > 0, there exists a δ > 0 such that d(ƒ(x0), ƒ(x)) < ε for all ƒ ∈ F and all x such that d(x0, x) < δ. 
The family is pointwise equicontinuous if it is equicontinuous at each point of X.

The family F is uniformly equicontinuous if for every ε > 0, there exists a δ > 0 such that  d(ƒ(x1), ƒ(x2)) < ε for all ƒ ∈ F and all x1, x2 ∈ X such that d(x1, x2) < δ.

For comparison, the statement 'all functions ƒ in F are continuous' means that for every ε > 0, every ƒ ∈ F, and every x0 ∈ X, there exists a δ > 0 such that d(ƒ(x0), ƒ(x)) < ε for all x ∈ X such that d(x0, x) < δ.

 For continuity, δ may depend on ε, ƒ, and x0.
 For uniform continuity, δ may depend on ε and ƒ.
 For pointwise equicontinuity, δ may depend on ε and x0.
 For uniform equicontinuity, δ may depend only on ε.

More generally, when X is a topological space, a set F of functions from X to Y is said to be equicontinuous at x if for every ε > 0,  x has a neighborhood Ux such that
 
for all  and ƒ ∈ F. This definition usually appears in the context of topological vector spaces.

When X is compact, a set is uniformly equicontinuous if and only if it is equicontinuous at every point, for essentially the same reason as that uniform continuity and continuity coincide on compact spaces. 
Used on its own, the term "equicontinuity" may refer to either the pointwise or uniform notion, depending on the context.  On a compact space, these notions coincide.

Some basic properties follow immediately from the definition. Every finite set of continuous functions is equicontinuous.  The closure of an equicontinuous set is again equicontinuous. 
Every member of a uniformly equicontinuous set of functions is uniformly continuous, and every finite set of uniformly continuous functions is uniformly equicontinuous.

Examples 

A set of functions with a common Lipschitz constant is (uniformly) equicontinuous. In particular, this is the case if the set consists of functions with derivatives bounded by the same constant.
Uniform boundedness principle gives a sufficient condition for a set of continuous linear operators to be equicontinuous.
A family of iterates of an analytic function  is  equicontinuous on the  Fatou set.

Counterexamples 

The sequence of functions fn(x) = arctan(nx), is not equicontinuous because the definition is violated at x0=0

Equicontinuity of maps valued in topological groups 

Topological vector spaces are prominent examples of topological groups and every topological group has an associated canonical uniformity.

Clearly, every finite set of continuous maps from  into  is equicontinuous.

Equicontinuous linear maps

Because every topological vector space (TVS) is a topological group so the definition of an equicontinuous family of maps given for topological groups transfers to TVSs without change.

Characterization of equicontinuous linear maps

A family  of maps of the form  between two topological vector spaces is said to be   if for every neighborhood  of the origin in  there exists some neighborhood  of the origin in  such that  for all  

Let  and  be topological vector spaces (TVSs) and  be a family of linear operators from  into  
Then the following are equivalent: 
 is equicontinuous;
 is equicontinuous at every point of  
 is equicontinuous at some point of  
 is equicontinuous at the origin.
 that is, for every neighborhood  of the origin in  there exists a neighborhood  of the origin in  such that  (or equivalently, for every ).
  denotes endowed with the topology of point-wise convergence.

while if  is locally convex then this list may be extended to include:

for every continuous seminorm  on  there exists a continuous seminorm  on  such that  for all  
 Here,  means that  for all 

 is bounded in  
  denotes endowed with the topology of bounded convergence (that is, uniform convergence on bounded subsets of 

 (that is,  is uniformly bounded in the operator norm).

Characterization of equicontinuous linear functionals

Let  be a topological vector space (TVS) over the field  with continuous dual space  

For any subset  the following are equivalent: 
 is equicontinuous.
 is equicontinuous at the origin.
 is equicontinuous at some point of  
 is contained in the polar of some neighborhood of the origin in 

while if  is normed then this list may be extended to include:
 is a strongly bounded subset of 

while if  is a barreled space then this list may be extended to include:
 is relatively compact in the weak* topology on 
 is weak* bounded (that is,  is bounded in ).
 is bounded in the topology of bounded convergence (that is,  is bounded in ).

Properties of equicontinuous linear maps

Properties of equicontinuous linear functionals

Equicontinuity and uniform convergence

Let X be a compact Hausdorff space, and equip C(X) with the uniform norm, thus making C(X) a Banach space, hence a metric space.  Then Arzelà–Ascoli theorem states that a subset of C(X) is compact if and only if it is closed, uniformly bounded and equicontinuous. 
This is analogous to the Heine–Borel theorem, which states that subsets of Rn are compact if and only if they are closed and bounded. 
As a corollary, every uniformly bounded equicontinuous sequence in C(X) contains a subsequence that converges uniformly to a continuous function on X.

In view of Arzelà–Ascoli theorem, a sequence in C(X) converges uniformly if and only if it is equicontinuous and converges pointwise. The hypothesis of the statement can be weakened a bit: a sequence in C(X) converges uniformly if it is equicontinuous and converges pointwise on a dense subset to some function on X  (not assumed continuous).

This weaker version is typically used to prove Arzelà–Ascoli theorem for separable compact spaces. Another consequence is that the limit of an equicontinuous pointwise convergent sequence of continuous functions on a metric space, or on a locally compact space, is continuous. (See below for an example.) 
In the above, the hypothesis of compactness of X  cannot be relaxed. 
To see that, consider a compactly supported continuous function g on R with g(0) = 1, and consider the equicontinuous sequence of functions  on R defined by ƒn(x) = .  Then, ƒn converges pointwise to 0 but does not converge uniformly to 0.

This criterion for uniform convergence is often useful in real and complex analysis. Suppose we are given a sequence of continuous functions that converges pointwise on some open subset G of Rn. As noted above, it actually converges uniformly on a compact subset of G if it is equicontinuous on the compact set. In practice, showing the equicontinuity is often not so difficult. For example, if the sequence consists of differentiable functions or functions with some regularity (e.g., the functions are solutions of a differential equation), then the mean value theorem or some other kinds of estimates can be used to show the sequence is equicontinuous. It then follows that the limit of the sequence is continuous on every compact subset of G; thus, continuous on G. A similar argument can be made when the functions are holomorphic. One can use, for instance, Cauchy's estimate to show the equicontinuity (on a compact subset) and conclude that the limit is holomorphic. Note that the equicontinuity is essential here. For example, ƒn(x) =  converges to a multiple of the discontinuous sign function.

Generalizations

Equicontinuity in topological spaces

The most general scenario in which equicontinuity can be defined is for topological spaces whereas uniform equicontinuity requires the filter of neighbourhoods of one point to be somehow comparable with the filter of neighbourhood of another point.  The latter is most generally done via a uniform structure, giving a uniform space.  Appropriate definitions in these cases are as follows:

A set A of functions continuous between two topological spaces X and Y is topologically equicontinuous at the points x ∈ X and y ∈ Y if for any open set O about y, there are neighborhoods U of x and V of y such that for every f ∈ A, if the intersection of f[U] and V is nonempty,  f[U] ⊆ O. Then A is said to be topologically equicontinuous at x ∈ X if it is topologically equicontinuous at x and y for each y ∈ Y. Finally, A is equicontinuous if it is equicontinuous at x for all points x ∈ X.

A set A of continuous functions between two uniform spaces X and Y is uniformly equicontinuous if for every element W of the uniformity on Y,  the set

is a  member of the uniformity on X

Introduction to uniform spaces

We now briefly describe the basic idea underlying uniformities.

Uniformities generalize the idea (taken from metric spaces) of points that are "-close" (for ), meaning that their distance is < . 
For any , let 
 
denote the set of all pairs of points that are -close. 
In this way, the sets  encapsulate all the information necessary to define things such as uniform continuity and uniform convergence without needing any metric. 
Axiomatizing the most basic properties of these sets leads to the definition of a uniformity. 
Indeed, the sets  generate the uniformity that is canonically associated with the metric space .

The benefit of this generalization is that we may now extend some important definitions that make sense for metric spaces (e.g. completeness) to a broader category of topological spaces. 
In particular, to topological groups and topological vector spaces.

A weaker concept is that of even continuity

A set A of continuous functions between two topological spaces X and Y is said to be evenly continuous at x ∈ X and y ∈ Y if given any open set O containing y there are neighborhoods U of x and V of y such that f[U] ⊆ O whenever f(x) ∈ V. It is evenly continuous at x if it is evenly continuous at x and y for every y ∈ Y, and evenly continuous if it is evenly continuous at x for every x ∈ X.

Stochastic equicontinuity

Stochastic equicontinuity is a version of equicontinuity used in the context of sequences of functions of random variables, and their convergence.

See also

 
 
 
 
 
 
 
  - an analogue of a continuous function in discrete spaces.

Notes

References

 
 .
   
 .
 
   
  

Theory of continuous functions
Mathematical analysis